Hamilton Town Center is a retail lifestyle center in Noblesville, Indiana, United States. Opened in 2008, it is managed by Simon Property Group, who owns 50% of it.

History
The center opened in 2008 with Dick's Sporting Goods, J. C. Penney, Bed Bath & Beyond, Borders Books & Music (closed 2011), Designer Shoe Warehouse, Ulta, Stein Mart, and Squeeze Play are among its anchor stores. Bed Bath & Beyond and J. C. Penney predated the mall's opening by several months. Borders closed in 2011 and was replaced by an Earth Fare organic supermarket, which has also since closed.

References

External links
Hamilton Town Center

Shopping malls established in 2008
Simon Property Group
Shopping malls in Indiana
Buildings and structures in Hamilton County, Indiana
Tourist attractions in Hamilton County, Indiana
Lifestyle centers (retail)